Sărățica may refer to one of two places in Leova District, Moldova:

Sărățica Nouă, a commune
Sărățica Veche, a village in Tomaiul Nou commune